Katharina "Käthe" Dorsch (29 December 1890 – 25 December 1957) was a German stage and film actor.

Biography
Katharina Dorsch was born on 29 December 1890 at 5:30 P.M. in the Bavarian town of Neumarkt in der Oberpfalz, the daughter of Christoph Dorsch (died 1901), a bakery helper, and Magdalena Dorsch (née Lindl). Her family moved to Nuremberg when she was three years old. Dorsch attended a trade school, took piano lessons, and had her first engagement aged 15 as a choir singer at the Staatstheater, performing Wagner's Die Meistersinger von Nürnberg. Later, she also performed in Hanau and Mannheim, mainly participating in operettas.

Dorsch's first major role was as Ännchen in the Max Halbe drama Youth, being the substitute for a sick colleague. Despite Dorsch's negative attitude towards the operetta, for financial reasons she decided to commit herself as a soubrette soprano in Mainz in 1908, going to Berlin in 1911 to perform at the Theater am Schiffbauerdamm. Dorsch also worked at the Residenz Theatre, Deutsches Theater, and Konzerthaus Berlin. In 1927 she traveled to Vienna, where she performed at the Volkstheater. She appeared in Carl Zuckmayer's 1927 play Schinderhannes. Her greatest success was in the title role of Franz Lehár's operetta Friederike, which premiered on 4 October 1928 at the Neues Schauspielhaus.

In 1936, Dorsch appeared at the Staatstheater in Berlin, and was a member of the Burgtheater from 1939 until her death. She returned to the Berlin stage in 1946.

In addition to her lengthy stage career, Dorsch also appeared on the screen. She made her film debut in the 1916 short Allzuviel ist ungesund. She appeared in numerous films before taking a hiatus in 1924. She returned to the film industry in 1930, starring in Die Lindenwirtin, followed by Three Days of Love (1931). Her final screen appearance was in Regine (1956).

Dorsch and her childhood friend Hermann Göring took advantage of interventions for racially threatened or politically persecuted colleagues, such as the Kabarett artist Werner Finck, who was released from the Esterwegen concentration camp on 1 July 1935.

In 1946, Dorsch slapped the then 24 year old critic Wolfgang Harich for writing a bad review about one of her plays. In 1951, she slapped Alexander Trojan for making fun of people who were born under the Zodiac sign Capricorn. In 1956, she caused a media sensation when she also slapped the Austrian theater critic Hans Weigel in front of a Vienna café.

In 1920, Dorsch married fellow actor Harry Liedtke. The two divorced in 1928. The tie to Liedtke went beyond divorce; Dorsch never overcame Liedtke's 1945 murder by the Soviet Red Army.

Dorsch died on 25 December 1957 of liver disease. She is buried at the cemetery of Bad Saarow-Pieskow alongside ex-husband Harry Liedtke and his wife Christa Tordy. A memorial stands at Waldfriedhof Dahlem in Berlin.

In 1962, the Käthe-Dorsch-Gasse was named after her in Vienna. In 1966 in Gropiusstadt, a high rise building was named Käthe-Dorsch-Ring.

Partial filmography

 The Queen's Secretary (1916, Short)
 Ein tolles Mädchen (1916)
 Ein Narr der Liebe (1916)
 Ein Jagdausflug nach Berlin (1917)
 Die Memoiren des Satans, 1. Teil - Doktor Mors (1917-1918, part 1, 3)
 Das fidele Gefängnis (1917) - Mizi
 Dornröschen (1917) - The queen
 John Riew - Ein Mädchenschicksal (917) - Annas Mutter
 Frau Lenes Scheidung (1917) - Lene Semmelhak
 Die Memoiren des Satans, 3.Teil - Der Fluchbeladene (1918)
 Gezwungene Liebe (1918)
 Ehemann a. D. (1918)
 Sein letzter Seitensprung (1918) - Frau des Gefängnisdirektors
 Der Glücksjunge (1918) - Fürstin Stachow
 Amor in der Klemme (1918)
 Keimendes Leben (1918-1919, part 1, 2) - (uncredited)
 Die blaue Mauritius (1918)
 Die Kunst zum Heiraten (1918)
 Erborgtes Glück (1919)
 Der junge Goethe (1919)
 Moral und Sinnlichkeit (1919) - Lisbeth
 Vendetta (1919) - Miss Ruth Alcott
 The Blue Mauritius (1919) - Stenotypsitin Else
 Können Gedanken töten? (1920) - Ragna
 Der Schauspieler der Herzogin (1920)
 The Prisoner (1920) - Crusius, Hertha, Tochter, Braut
 The Sins of the Mother (1921) - Louisa
 Miss Julie (1922) - Christine - Kitchen Maid
 Does a Woman Have to Become a Mother? (1924) - Else Hardt, geb Wolf
 Die Lindenwirtin (1930) - Annemarie Babinger, Landwirtin
 Three Days of Love (1931) - Lena
 Savoy Hotel 217 (1936) - Anna Fedorowna Orlowa
 A Woman of No Importance (1936) - Sylvia Kelvil
 Yvette (1938) - Oktavia Obardi
 Morgen werde ich verhaftet (1939) - Maria Burger
 Mistake of the Heart (1939) - Oberin
 A Mother's Love (1939) - Marthe Pirlinger
 Trenck, der Pandur (1940) - Kaiserin Maria Theresia
 The Comedians (1941) - Karoline Neuber
 Singende Engel (1947) - Kaiserin
 Journey to Happiness (1948) - Celia Loevengaard
 Das Kuckucksei (1949) - Marie Müller
 The Prisoner (1949) - Eugenie - Marquise de Troissaules
 Regine (1956) - Therese Lund (final film role)

References

External links
 
 
 Photos of Käthe Dorsch
 

1890 births
1957 deaths
People from Neumarkt in der Oberpfalz
People from the Kingdom of Bavaria
German stage actresses
German film actresses
German silent film actresses
20th-century German actresses